Roy Evans is a former professional rugby league footballer who played in the 1950s and 1960s.

Playing career

International honours
Roy Evans won caps for Great Britain while at Wigan in 1961 against New Zealand (2 matches), and in 1962 against France, and New Zealand.

Championship final appearances
Roy Evans played  in Wigan's 27-3 victory over Wakefield Trinity in the Championship Final during the 1959–60 season at Odsal Stadium, Bradford on Saturday 21 May 1960.

Challenge Cup Final appearances
Roy Evans played  in Wigan's 30-13 victory over Hull F.C. in the 1959 Challenge Cup Final during the 1958–59 season at Wembley Stadium, London on Saturday 9 May 1959, in front of a crowd of 79,811, and played right-, i.e. number 12, in the 20-16 victory over Hunslet in the 1965 Challenge Cup Final during the 1964–65 season at Wembley Stadium, London on Saturday 8 May 1965, in front of a crowd of 89,016.

County League appearances
Roy Evans played in Wigan's victories in the Lancashire County League during the 1958–59 season and 1961–62 season.

References

External links
!Great Britain Statistics at englandrl.co.uk (statistics currently missing due to not having appeared for both Great Britain, and England)

Living people
English rugby league players
Great Britain national rugby league team players
Place of birth missing (living people)
Rugby league locks
Rugby league second-rows
Wigan Warriors players
Year of birth missing (living people)